The Grupo renovación was an Argentine composers' association founded in 1929 to promote modern music.

The Grupo renovación was founded on 22 October 1929. The aims of the group were "to discuss compositions of its members; to perform and to publish their best works; to arrange performances of native music abroad; and to discuss publicly the general subject of music, with the intention of contribution to the progress of musical culture". The founding members were the older two Castro brothers (José María and Juan José), Gilardo Gilardi, Juan Carlos Paz, and Jacobo Ficher, a naturalized Russian. The third Castro brother, Washington, joined at some later date. In 1932, Juan José Castro and Gilardi left the group and Honorio Siccardi and Luis Gianneo joined. Gianneo remained until 1944. In 1936 Paz left the group to found his own series of concerts, Conciertos de la Nueva Música. Alfredo Pinto was briefly a member of the group in 1935. The organization eventually was transformed into the Argentine section of the International Society for Contemporary Music.

They provided the hall at the lowest possible cost, enabling the group to keep the price of admission to just half a peso. In the mid-1940s, the Grupo renovación gave as many as fifteen concerts a year, in a season lasting through the winter from March to November.

References

Sources

Music organisations based in Argentina
Composition schools
Contemporary music organizations
Musical groups established in 1929